Fin Bathhouse is a "bath museum" that is located in Fin garden, Kashan, and it is the shambles of Amir Kabir. This bathroom consists of two large and small bathrooms. The construction of a small bathroom is related to the Safavid era and has been created with the original garden building. By building a large bath in the time of Fath Ali Shah, the large bath was allocated to state dignitaries and VIPs of the community, and it was known as the Royal Bathroom. In contrast, the small bathroom was recognized as the crew bathroom and was used by the general population.
The remarkable thing is that both bathrooms had all the traditional features and architectural landmarks. Fin Bath in 1314 was registered as a national monument and was registered in the UNESCO World Heritage List in 2011.

References

World Heritage Sites in Iran
Museums in Iran
Architecture in Iran
Kashan
Landscape design history
Public baths in Iran